Chamaeclea pernana is a moth in the family Noctuidae (the owlet moths) first described by Augustus Radcliffe Grote in 1881. It is found in North America.

The MONA or Hodges number for Chamaeclea pernana is 9789.

References

Further reading

External links
 

Amphipyrinae
Articles created by Qbugbot
Moths described in 1881